Diane Simmes (born February 8, 1959), better known by her ring name Misty Blue Simmes, is an American former professional wrestler.

Career

Beginning 
Simmes got into wrestling after learning to box and being part of an all-female boxing show. From there, she was invited to Killer Kowalski's wrestling school where she trained for 18 months prior to her first match.

American Wrestling Association 
Simmes competed for the American Wrestling Association in a 10 woman battle royal at WrestleRock 86 on April 20, 1986. The match was won by Sherri Martel.

National Wrestling Alliance 
In 1986, Simmes joined the National Wrestling Alliance (NWA) and was awarded the NWA United States Women's Championship (a replacement of the prior NWA World Women's Championship held by Debbie Combs). She once challenged Combs to a title unification match (NWA United States Women's Title and NWA World Women's Title), but was attacked by Combs' manager/mother Cora Combs. She frequently defended the NWA U.S. Women's Title against Linda Dallas, Kat LeRoux, Black Venus, Mad Dog Debbie Irons and a handful of other women on the NWA's TV programs World Wide Wrestling and World Championship Wrestling. Many of the matches between Dallas and Simmes ended with the two battling each other with Dallas' kendo stick. She also frequently partnered with Heidi Lee Morgan and Vula in tag-team matches.

She also briefly feuded with Jim Cornette. During a televised interview on TBS, Simmes requested that Cornette help train her only to lure him into the ring and nail him with a drop kick. When the Midnight Express hit the ring, Dusty Rhodes appeared to even the sides. Simmes then competed in an 8-person mixed tag team match partnering with Rhodes, Nikita Koloff, and Barry Windham against Cornette, The Midnight Express, and Dick Murdoch. However, the angle never reached the popularity of Cornette's similar feud with Baby Doll.

While Madusa Miceli was the reigning AWA World Women's Champion, Simmes challenged her to a title unification match (NWA United States Women's Title and AWA World Women's Title) at a Delta Tiger Lilies event, but the match never happened.

Independent circuit 
When the NWA phased out the women's division in late 1989, Simmes wrestled on the independent circuit and eventually joined the Ladies Professional Wrestling Association. She and Heidi Lee Morgan competed as Team America and won the LPWA Tag Team Titles. They lost the titles to The Glamour Girls.

Misty feuded with Monster Ripper in Puerto Rico and won a title from her. There are unverified reports that Misty may have lost some matches, but no visual or readily available written proof seems to exist.

World Championship Wrestling 
In late 1991, Simmes wrestled in World Championship Wrestling, which had evolved from the Jim Crockett Promotions branch of the NWA. She competed in matches against Linda Dallas and Kat LeRoux.

Personal life 
She is married to Jon Simmes.

Prior to becoming a professional wrestler, Simmes and her husband Jon appeared and performed in several pornographic films during the early-to-mid 1980s, with Simmes performing under the pseudonym Bunny Hatton. In 1983, Simmes appeared in the pornographic film "Slit Skirts" in a scene with Ron Jeremy.

Championships and accomplishments 
 International World Class Championship Wrestling
 IWCCW Women's Championship (1 time)
 International Wrestling Association
 IWA Women's Championship (1 time)
 International Wrestling Federation
 IWF Women's Championship (1 time)
 Ladies Professional Wrestling Association
 LPWA Tag Team Championship (1 time) - with Heidi Lee Morgan
 National Wrestling Alliance
 NWA United States Women's Championship (1 time)
 NWA Hall of Fame (Class of 2012)
 World Wrestling Council
 WWC Women's Championship (1 time)
 World Wide Wrestling Alliance
 WWWA Woman's Championship (1 time)
 Other titles
 BBP (Vermont) Women's Championship
 NCW/IWA Intercontinental Women's Championship
 NCW/IWA United States Women's Championship

References

External links 
 
 
 
 https://www.newspapers.com/image/?clipping_id=15735045&fcfToken=eyJhbGciOiJIUzI1NiIsInR5cCI6IkpXVCJ9.eyJmcmVlLXZpZXctaWQiOjM0NzIwMzU3NSwiaWF0IjoxNTcxNjY2MzEzLCJleHAiOjE1NzE3NTI3MTN9.vhjm_Kkz3pE-DDop5fYX9RjEGy-1CHddSwLhUYP_NMshttp://www.onlineworldofwrestling.com/profiles/m/misty-blue-simmes.html Online World of Wrestling profile] age cited in article

1956 births
American female professional wrestlers
American pornographic film actresses
Living people
21st-century American women